Onward to Golgotha is the debut studio album by the American death metal band Incantation. The album was released in 1992 on Relapse Records. It was re-released in October 2006 with a bonus DVD of live performances. In the January edition of the American heavy metal magazine Decibel they added it as their 72nd hall of fame album. To celebrate being added to the hall of fame it will be re-released on 180 gram vinyl, but limited to only 1,000 copies.

Track listing

DVD

Cell Block Show

  "Entrentment of Evil"
  "Deliverance of Horrific Prophecies"
  "Unholy Massacre"
  "Devoured Death"
  "Blasphemous Cremation"
  "Profanation"
  "Golgotha"

Studio 1 Show

  "Devoured Death"
  "Entrentment of Evil"
  "Bleeding Torment (Necrophagia Cover)"
  "Deliverance of Horrific Prophecies"

Flashes Show

  "Deliverance of Horrific Prophecies"
  "Devoured Death"
  "Rotting Spiritual Embodiment"
  "Unholy Massacre"
  "Blasphemous Cremation"
  "Christening the Afterbirth"
  "Profanation"

Credits
Craig Pillard - Guitar, Vocals
John McEntee - Lead Guitar
Jim Roe - Drums
Ronny Deo - Bass
Steve Evetts - Producer, Engineer
Dave Shirk - Mastering
Miran Kim - Cover Artwork

References

Sources 
 http://www.metalsucks.net/2010/11/24/dont-forget-to-be-thank-for-fear-emptiness-decibel/

External links 

Incantation (band) albums
1992 debut albums
Relapse Records albums
Albums produced by Steve Evetts